Pedro Nuno Coelho Cervantes (born 13 July 1981) is a Portuguese former footballer who played as a midfielder.

Club career
Born in Porto, Cervantes amassed Segunda Liga totals of 299 games and 21 goals over 13 seasons, representing Leça FC, A.D. Ovarense, Associação Naval 1º de Maio, Leixões SC, U.D. Leiria, C.D. Aves, C.D. Santa Clara and Varzim SC. He made his debut in the competition whilst at the service of the first club, playing 59 minutes in a 2–0 away win against Naval on 18 March 2001.

Cervantes' input in the Primeira Liga consisted of 32 matches, 21 with Leixões in the 2007–08 campaign and 11 with Leiria in 2009–10. His maiden appearance in the competition took place on 18 August 2007, when he started for the former in a 1–1 home draw with S.L. Benfica.

References

External links

1981 births
Living people
Footballers from Porto
Portuguese footballers
Association football midfielders
Primeira Liga players
Liga Portugal 2 players
Campeonato de Portugal (league) players
Leça F.C. players
A.D. Ovarense players
Associação Naval 1º de Maio players
Leixões S.C. players
U.D. Leiria players
C.D. Aves players
C.D. Santa Clara players
Varzim S.C. players